Clarence Barker Culbertson (October 17, 1869 – January 29, 1951) was an American lawyer and politician.

Born in Edinboro, Pennsylvania, Culbertson moved with his parents to Augusta, Wisconsin. Culbertson went to University of Wisconsin and then received his law degree from University of Wisconsin Law School in 1894. He practiced law in Stanley, Wisconsin and served as Stanley city attorney. He served as district attorney of Chippewa County, Wisconsin and on the Chippewa County Board of Supervisors. In 1909, Culbertson served in the Wisconsin State Assembly as a Republican. Culbertson died in a hospital in Marshfield, Wisconsin.

References

1869 births
1951 deaths
People from Erie County, Pennsylvania
People from Stanley, Wisconsin
University of Wisconsin–Madison alumni
University of Wisconsin Law School alumni
Wisconsin lawyers
County supervisors in Wisconsin
Republican Party members of the Wisconsin State Assembly
People from Augusta, Wisconsin